The Basilica Block Party is an annual two-day music festival that takes place in Minneapolis, Minnesota. The event is hosted by the Basilica of St. Mary and described by City Pages as "summertime's hottest church party". The festival is the largest music festival held within the city of Minneapolis.

The event is in its third decade, with past headlining artists including Ryan Adams, Weezer, Imagine Dragons, Ray LaMontagne, Panic! at the Disco, Trampled by Turtles, Spoon, Ziggy Marley and The Wallflowers.

The party is a fundraiser to help pay for the structural restoration of the Basilica.

History

The event serves to raise money toward the ongoing restoration of the Basilica of St. Mary. The event is in its 24th summer and draws approximately 25,000 attendees to downtown Minneapolis every summer.

The event "started off with controversy" in 1995, according to The Star Tribune, as "people questioned using beer and rock music to raise money for a historic Catholic church." It began as a fundraiser to pay for a $9.5 million structural restoration of the Basilica of St Mary, the first basilica established in the United States of America. Five percent of the proceeds from the event go toward the St. Vincent de Paul outreach program, which provides services to those in need.

In its opening year, it drew more than 15,000 people, raising over $100,000.

In 1995, the majority of the bands were local. Since then, the roster has evolved, with past performers including Semisonic, The Wallflowers, The Avett Brothers, Weezer, AWOLNATION, and Ryan Adams.

Due to the COVID-19 pandemic in Minnesota the block party was cancelled in 2020. The 2021 event is scheduled for September 10–11.

Lineups

2019

Friday July 12
 Kacey Musgraves
 Semisonic
 Dawes
 The Jayhawks
 Anderson East
 Ruston Kelly
 Yam Haus
 Kiss The Tiger
 Annie Mack
 McNasty Brass Band

Saturday July 13
 Flora Cash
 Jason Mraz
 CHVRCHES
 Hanson
 Metric
 Johnnyswim
 Lissie
 Michael Shynes
 The Bad Man
 Static Panic

2018

Friday July 6
 Jason Isbell & The 400 Unit
 Fitz and the Tantrums
 John Butler Trio
 The Revolution
 Delta Rae
 Now, Now
 TABAH
 Lena Elizabeth
 Kid Dakota
 LadyLark

Saturday July 7
 CAKE
 Andy Grammer
 BORNS
 Judah & the Lion
 Third Eye Blind
 Early Eyes
 Flint Eastwood
 Lazy Scorese
 The Shackletons
 Reina del Cid

2017

Friday July 7
 Brandi Carlile
 The Shins
 Andrew McMahon in the Wilderness
 Needtobreathe
 Cobi
 John Paul White
 The Roosevelts
 Nick Jordan
 Jaedyn James & The Hunger
 Night Moves

Saturday July 8
 WALK THE MOON
 AWOLNATION
 Gavin DeGraw
 Ben Rector
 Walk Off the Earth
 Julia Brennan
 Enemy Planes
 Nook Jones
 Jackson & The Roosters
 J.S. Ondara

2016

Friday July 8
 Death Cab for Cutie
 Gary Clark Jr.
 American Authors
 Cold War Kids
 X Ambassadors
 Andra Day
 Gospel Machine
 Fort Wilson Riot

Saturday July 9
 The Fray
 Ryan Adams & The Shinning
 Phillip Phillips
 Milky Chance
 Matt Nathanson
 Craig Fin
 Ron Pope
 Eric Mayson
 Holiday
 Farewell Milwaukee

2015

Friday July 10
 Weezer
 O.A.R
 Nate Ruess of Fun.
 Mat Kearney
 Motion City Soundtrack
 Matthew Sweet
 Zoo Animal
 Rupert Angeleyes
 TYTE JEFF

Saturday July 11
 Wilco
 Fitz and the Tantrums
 Jason Isbell
 Echosmith
 Rachel Platten
 Jenny Lewis
 Fly Golden Eagle
 Aero Flynn
 Southside Desire
 American Scarecrows

2014

Friday, July 11
 Edward Sharpe & the Magnetic Zeros
 Michael Franti & Spearhead
 Panic! at the Disco
 Delta Rae
 Eric Hutchinson
 Crash
 The Weeks
 Black Diet
 Carroll
 Sterol Confessions
 Black Diet

Saturday July 12
 Train
 Ben Harper & Charlie Musselwhite
 Ingrid Michaelson
 The Wild Feathers
 Caroline Smith
 Alpha Rev
 Serena Ryder
 Jillian Rae
 BBGUN

2013

Friday July 12
 Grace Potter & The Nocturnals
 Matt Nathanson
 Father John Misty
 ZZ Ward
 Mayer Hawthorne
 Family of the Year
 Churchill
 Actual Wlf
 The Cactus Blossoms
 Southwire

Saturday July 13
 Matchbox Twenty
 Sharon Jones & The Dap Kings
 Goo Goo Dolls
 Walk the Moon
 Cloud Cult
 Kate Earl
 additional local bands

2012

Friday, July 6
 Train
 Cake
 The Head and the Heart
 Imagine Dragons
 Mat Kearney
 Tyrone Wells
 additional local artists

Saturday, July 7
 The Avett Brothers
 O.A.R
 Fitz and the Tantrums
 Graffiti6
 The Lumineers
 Stuart D'Rozario
 additional local artists

2011
 The Jayhawks
 David Gray
 Ray LaMontagne
 Lissie

2010
 Weezer
 Spoon
 Barenaked Ladies
 Grace Potter and the Nocturnals

References

Music festivals in Minnesota